Mabarrat Muhammad ῾Ali, the Muhammad ῾Ali Benevolent Society, is an Egyptian charitable women's organization established in Cairo in 1909.

The origins of the organization were in a health clinic established and financed by Princess Ayn-al-Hayat Rifaat at Abdeen, a poor Cairo neighbourhood. The Princess stipulated that the organization's president should always be a princess of the family, and that all committee members should be women. The society was codirected by two aristocratic women, the Muslim Hidaya Afifi Barakat (1899-1969) and the Christian Mary Khalil (1889-1979). It survived the 1952 Revolution, when many independent organizations were closed down. The society's hospitals were eventually nationalized in 1964, by which time they had treated around 13 million women.

References

Women's organisations based in Egypt 
Non-profit organisations based in Egypt
Defunct organisations based in Egypt
Organizations established in 1909
Organizations disestablished in 1964